The Embassy of the Democratic People's Republic of Korea in Lima is the official diplomatic mission of North Korea to the Republic of Peru. It is located in San Isidro District, Lima, Peru.

Diplomatic relations between Peru and North Korea are frozen since 2017, when Peru declared the Korean ambassador as a persona non grata and gave him 5 days to leave the country in response to the country's missile launches earlier that month.

History
North Korea opened a trade office in Peru in the 1970s, under the left-wing government of Juan Velasco Alvarado. Relations were officially established at an embassy level on December 15, 1988.

In 1987, the then trade office was bombed by terror group Shining Path. The attack was in response of the North Korean government's support of the Peruvian government against guerrillas during the country's internal conflict, which included the sale of 10,000 AK-47s to be used by the Peruvian National Police. Another attack was attempted in 1989, but the bomb did not detonate as it was defused by the Peruvian Police.

Ambassadors

See also
Embassy of South Korea, Lima
List of ambassadors of Peru to North Korea

References

Korea, North
Peru
Korea, North